Caramel apples or toffee apples are whole apples covered in a layer of caramel. They are created by dipping or rolling apples-on-a-stick in hot caramel, sometimes then rolling them in nuts or other small savories or confections, and allowing them to cool. When these additional ingredients, such as nut toppings, are added, the caramel apple can be called a taffy apple.

Production

For high-volume production of caramel apples, a sheet of caramel can be wrapped around the apple, followed by heating the apple to melt the caramel evenly onto it. This creates a harder caramel that is easier to transport but more difficult to eat. Caramel apple production at home usually involves melting pre-purchased caramel candies for dipping or making a homemade caramel from ingredients like corn syrup, brown sugar, butter, and vanilla. Homemade caramel generally results in a softer, creamier coating.

In recent years, it has become increasingly popular to decorate caramel apples for holidays like Halloween. Methods used to do this include applying sugar or salt to softened caramel, dipping cooled, hardened apples in white or milk chocolate, or painting designs onto finished caramel apples with white chocolate colored with food coloring.

Classically, the preferred apples for use in caramel apples are tart-tasting apples with a crisp texture such as Granny Smith.

History
Hunter’s Candy in Moscow, Idaho sold the first caramel apples in 1936. Hard-coated candy apples had been around since 1908, but Hunter's Candy created a new treat by coating the apples with their caramel. During World War II, these apples were shipped overseas to soldiers in Korea, Japan, and England.

In 1948, the Kastrup family founded The Affy Tapple Company. The recipe for their caramel apples came from Edna Kastrup and is still used today for their "The Original Caramel Apple" line

In 1960, Vito Raimondi patented the first automatic caramel apple making machine, replacing much of the process that involved production by hand.

See also

 Candy apple (also known as a "toffee apple" outside North America)
 Caramel Apple Pops
 List of apple dishes

References

External links
 

Confectionery
Halloween food
Apple dishes